José Marcos Garay Álvarez (born 10 July 1977) is a Mexican retired footballer.

Club career
He played for Tecos in the Mexican First Division.

External links
 

1977 births
Living people
Footballers from Jalisco
Association football goalkeepers
Tecos F.C. footballers
Liga MX players
Mexican footballers